The Brazilian blind snake (Trilepida brasiliensis) is a species of snake in the family Leptotyphlopidae.

References

Trilepida
Reptiles described in 1949